Dillwynia rudis is a species of flowering plant in the family Fabaceae and is endemic to eastern New South Wales. It is an erect shrub with warty, linear leaves and yellow to orange flowers with red veins.

Description

Taxonomy and naming
Dillwynia rudis was first formally described in 1825 by Augustin Pyramus de Candolle in his Prodromus Systematis Naturalis Regni Vegetabilis from an unpublished description by Franz Sieber. The specific epithet (rudis) means "rough" or "wild".

Distribution and habitat
This dillwynia grows in heath and woodland between the Sydney region and the Goulburn River area and south along the coast and ranges of New South Wales.

References

rudis
Flora of New South Wales
Plants described in 1825
Taxa named by Augustin Pyramus de Candolle